The yellow cypripedium, Cypripedium flavum, is a species of orchid. It is endemic to China, found in the provinces of Gansu, Hubei, Sichuan, Xizang (Tibet), and Yunnan.

The species epithet flavum is Latin for yellow and indicates its flower colour.

References

flavum
Orchids of China